Henry Northing Swaby (22 January 1906 – 1982) was an English professional footballer who played as a defender.

References

1906 births
1982 deaths
Footballers from Grimsby
English footballers
Association football defenders
Grimsby YMCA F.C. players
Cleethorpes Town F.C. players
Grimsby Town F.C. players
Barnsley F.C. players
Scarborough F.C. players
Grantham Town F.C. players
Gainsborough Trinity F.C. players
English Football League players